"Robert De Niro's Waiting..." is a song written by Sara Dallin, Siobhan Fahey, Keren Woodward, Steve Jolley, and Tony Swain, recorded for English girl group Bananarama's self-titled second album. Produced by Jolley & Swain, it was released as the album's second single on 20 February 1984. It namechecks American actor Robert De Niro. The single is one of the group's strongest-performing releases, peaking at number three in the UK Singles Chart. It made a brief appearance on the US Billboard Hot 100, peaking at number 95. Billboard ranked the song at number 74 on their list of the "100 Greatest Girl Group Songs of All Time".

An extended version of the song is available on the 12-inch single. The B-side of both 7-inch and 12-inch singles is a song called "Push!". The version of "Push!" on the 12-inch single is not extended but preceded by an unlisted alternate version of the brief track that would be called "Link" at the end of side one of the Bananarama album. Bananarama have re-recorded "Robert De Niro's Waiting..." twice, in 2000 for the G-A-Y compilation and the next year another new re-recording was included on their album Exotica.

Lyrical content
In Bananarama's 2017 reunion interview with The Guardian, original group member Siobhan Fahey explained the song's meaning; “The thing I’m proudest of,” (Fahey) continues, “is that we made quirky pop. The lyrics were much darker than you’d imagine. Robert De Niro’s Waiting is about date rape.” “You’ll listen to it with new ears now,” Woodward smiles. “I wanted it to be like Pull Up to the Bumper,” adds Dallin, dryly. “It didn’t quite work out like that, did it?”  This echoed similar statements in the group's contemporaneous, and earlier, interviews. However, in a 2019 interview with The Telegraph, bandmate Sara Dallin offered a different explanation of the song's meaning: "It was just about hero worship. It wasn't about rape. I don't know where that came from. It's absolute rubbish."

Music video
The music video for "Robert De Niro's Waiting..." was directed by Duncan Gibbins and shows Bananarama walking around dark streets, possibly followed by mafia-style clothed men. When it gets to the bridge part of the song, Dallin is shown running along, looking behind her as if being followed. As the video winds down, Dallin, Fahey, and Keren Woodward are back in their apartment, when the door bell rings. Woodward answers the door, only to be confronted by the man who might have been chasing them, armed with a Mafia-style violin case. As she looks nervously at him, the case falls open to reveal a sign saying "Pizza Delivery", along with three pizzas. Both the man and Woodward start laughing, and the video ends with Bananarama in their apartment eating the pizza and laughing.

Track listings
UK and US 7-inch vinyl single

UK: London Records NANA 6 / USA: London Records 820 033-7
"Robert De Niro's Waiting..." – 3:27
"Push!" – 4:08

+ some copies of the UK 7-inch came with a cut out postcard of Fahey, Woodward, or Dallin
+ there were also 3 separate UK picture disc releases each with a photo of Fahey, Woodward, or Dallin.

UK and US 12-inch vinyl single

UK: London Records NANX 6 / USA: London Records 820 033-1
"Robert De Niro's Waiting..." (extended version) – 5:43
"Link" (single version - unlisted on label and artwork) – 1:59
"Push!" – 4:08 (S. Dallin/S. Fahey/S. Jolley /A. Swain/K. Woodward)

+ the UK 12-inch was also available in 3 different vinyl colours: pink for Woodward, green for Fahey, and blue for Dallin, each with a large picture label.

Other versions
"Robert De Niro's Waiting..." (2000 version)
Taken from the album G-A-Y.

"Robert De Niro's Waiting..." (2001 version)
Taken from the album Exotica.

Charts

Weekly charts

Year-end charts

References

1983 songs
1984 singles
Bananarama songs
London Records singles
Robert De Niro
Song recordings produced by Jolley & Swain
Songs about actors
Songs written by Keren Woodward
Songs written by Sara Dallin
Songs written by Siobhan Fahey
Songs written by Steve Jolley (songwriter)
Songs written by Tony Swain (musician)